The Historic counties of the United Kingdom are ancient geographical divisions of the United Kingdom. Although not defined by any one function, over many centuries, various forms of administrative function have been based on them. These have included the areas of Parliamentary constituencies, the Court of quarter sessions, the areas in which a Lord-lieutenant and Sheriff serve, territorial units of the Militia, as well as the basis of the original county councils. Although these areas have subsequently changed, the historic counties on which they were originally based have not.  The Office for National Statistics recommended them in the Index of Place Names as a stable, unchanging geography which covers the whole of Great Britain.

History

England

The division of England into shires, later known as counties, began in the Kingdom of Wessex in the mid-Saxon period, many of the Wessex shires representing previously independent kingdoms.  With the Wessex conquest of Mercia in the 9th and 10th centuries, the system was extended to central England. At the time of the Domesday Book, northern England comprised Cheshire and Yorkshire (with the north-east being unrecorded). The remaining counties of the north (Westmorland, Lancashire, Cumberland, Northumberland and Durham) were established in the 12th century. Rutland was first recorded as a county in 1159.

Scotland

The Scottish counties have their origins in the 'sheriffdoms' first created in the reign of Alexander I (1107–24) and extended by David I (1124–53). The sheriff, operating from a royal castle, was the strong hand of the king in his sheriffdom with all embracing duties – judicial, military, financial and administrative. Sheriffdoms had been established over most of southern and eastern Scotland by the mid-13th century. Although there was a degree of fluidity in the areas of these early sheriffdoms, the pattern that existed in the late mediæval period is believed to be very close to that existing in the mid-nineteenth century. The central and western Highlands and the Isles (where resistance to Government was strongest) were not assigned to shires until the early modern period, Caithness becoming a sheriffdom in 1503 and Orkney in 1540.

Wales

The present-day pattern of the historic counties of Wales was established by the Laws in Wales Act 1535. This Act abolished the powers of the lordships of the March and established the Counties or shires of Denbigh, Montgomery, Radnor, Brecknock and Monmouth from the areas of the former lordships. The other eight counties had, by then, already been in existence since at least the 13th century. The historic counties are, however, based on much older traditional areas.

Northern Ireland

The division of Ireland into counties began during the reign of King John (1199-1216). This process continued for several hundred years, as more of Ireland came under the control of the English crown. Munster was divided into counties in 1571 and Connaught in 1579. Finally, Ulster was shired during the reign of James I. The complete set of counties as they are today were laid down in 1584 (with their modern boundaries not finally settled until 1605, or 1613 in the case of Londonderry albeit that it had existed as County Coleraine from Anglo-Norman times). As in Wales the counties were generally based on earlier, traditional areas.

Map

References

See also
Historic counties of England
Counties of Northern Ireland
Shires of Scotland
Historic counties of Wales

Geography of the United Kingdom
Types of subdivision in the United Kingdom